The Screen Award for Best Actor - Popular Choice has been introduced in 2009 during the Screen Awards. Unlike the Screen Award for Best Actor which is chosen by the jury, this trophy is given by the viewers to the actor whose performance is judged the most popular. Akshay Kumar was the first winner for his performance in Singh Is Kinng in 2009 but he did not accept his award and gave it away to Aamir Khan for Ghajini who thought he deserved it more. Shah Rukh Khan has won five times (2011, 2012, 2014, 2015, 2016) in the last six years thus making him the most Awarded Actor.

Winners

See also
Screen Awards

Screen Awards